The R663 road is a regional road in Ireland. It travels from the N24 road in Bansha, County Tipperary to the R513 in County Limerick, via the Glen of Aherlow and Galbally.

References

Regional roads in the Republic of Ireland
Roads in County Tipperary
Roads in County Limerick